Let Me Up (I've Had Enough) (styled on the cover with quotation marks) is the seventh studio album by the American band Tom Petty and the Heartbreakers, released on 27 April 1987. It features the most songwriting collaborations between Petty and lead guitarist Mike Campbell of any Petty album. It is also the first album not to feature then-former bassist Ron Blair on any tracks.

The Heartbreakers' approach when starting to work on the album in 1986 was to make it sound like a live recording. This technique contrasted with the heavy studio production on the band's previous album, Southern Accents and was influenced by touring as Bob Dylan's backing band.

Let Me Up (I've Had Enough) is also notable for being the only previous studio album not represented on Petty's 1993 Greatest Hits album, even though the single "Jammin' Me" (co-written with fellow Traveling Wilbury Bob Dylan) was No. 1 on the Mainstream Rock Tracks for four weeks and No. 18 on the Hot 100. "Jammin' Me" was later included on the compilation album Anthology: Through the Years.

Reception

The album received generally positive reviews from critics. Stephen Thomas Erlewine from AllMusic described the album as "their simplest album since Hard Promises." However, he also stated that Let Me Up (I've Had Enough) was "filled with loose ends, song fragments, and unvarnished productions, it's a defiantly messy album, and it's all the better for it."

Cash Box said that the single "All Mixed Up" "tells a wondering, bittersweet story of life and love in the 80's."

Track listing

Charts

Certifications

Personnel
Tom Petty & The Heartbreakers

Tom Petty – lead and backing vocals, guitars (acoustic, electric, 12-string, bass)
Mike Campbell – lead guitars (12-string, electric, acoustic, bass, resonator, slide), koto, keyboards, dulcimer, mandolin, ukulele, percussion
Benmont Tench – acoustic and electric pianos, Hammond and Vox organs, vibraphone, synthesizer
Howie Epstein – bass guitar, backing vocals
Stan Lynch – drums, percussion

Production

 Annalisa – photography 
 Bruce Barris – assistant engineer 
 Nick Basich – assistant engineer
 Mike Campbell - production, engineer
 Paul Chinn - photography
 Mark Desisto – assistant engineer 
 Mick Haggerty – design, art
 Bob Ludwig – mastering
 Tom Petty - production
 Don Smith – engineer
 Mike Shipley – mixing
 Andy Udoff – assistant engineer
 Alan Weidel – assistant engineer 
 Shelly Yakus – overdub engineer

References 

1987 albums
Tom Petty albums
MCA Records albums
Albums produced by Tom Petty
Albums recorded at Sound City Studios